Concordia Research Station, which opened in 2005, is a French–Italian research facility that was built  above sea level at a location called Dome C on the Antarctic Plateau, Antarctica. The facility is also located within Australia's claim on Antarctica, the Australian Antarctic Territory.

Concordia Station is the third permanent, all-year research station on the Antarctic Plateau besides Vostok Station (Russian) and the Amundsen–Scott South Pole Station (U.S.) at the Geographic South Pole. It is jointly operated by scientists from France and Italy and regularly hosts ESA scientists.

History 
In 1992, France built a new station on the Antarctic Plateau. The program was later joined by Italy in 1993.

In 1995, Pr. Jean Vernin from University of Nice Sophia-Antipolis and Pr. Giorgio Dall'Oglio from University of Rome performed the first scientific experience towards a site qualification at Dome C.

In 1996, a French-Italian team established a summer camp at Dome C. The two main objectives of the camp were the provision of logistical support for the European Project for Ice Coring in Antarctica (EPICA) and the construction of a permanent research station.

The new all-year facility, Concordia Station, became operational in 2005. The first winterover began with a staff of 13 (eleven French and 2 Italians) in February 2005.

Transportation

Most of the cargo is moved to Dome C by traverse (called raid) from Dumont d'Urville Station, covering  in 7 to 12 days depending on weather conditions.

Environment 
Dome C is situated on top of the Antarctic Plateau. No animals or plants live at a distance of more than a few tens of kilometers from the Southern Ocean. However, south polar skuas have been spotted overflying the station, 1,200 km away from their nearest food sources. It is believed that these birds have learned to cross the continent instead of circumnavigating it.

Human biology and medicine 
Concordia Station shares many stressor characteristics similar to that of long-duration deep-space missions, in particular extreme isolation and confinement, and therefore serves as a useful analogue platform for research relevant to space medicine. During the winter, the crew are isolated from the outside world, having no transportation and limited communication for 9 months and live a prolonged period in complete darkness, at an altitude almost equivalent to 4000m at the equator. This creates physiological and psychological strains on the crew. Concordia station is particularly useful for the study of chronic hypobaric hypoxia, stress secondary to confinement and isolation, circadian rhythm and sleep disruption, individual and group psychology, telemedicine, and astrobiology. Concordia station has been proposed as one of the real-life Earth-based analogues for long-duration deep-space missions.

Glaciology 
In the 1970s, Dome C was the site of ice core drilling by field teams of several nations.
In the 1990s, Dome C was chosen for deep ice core drilling by the European Project for Ice Coring in Antarctica (EPICA). Drilling at Dome C began in 1996 and was completed on December 21, 2004, reaching a drilling depth of 3270.2 m, 5 m above bedrock. The age of the oldest recovered ice is estimated to be ca. 900,000 years.

Astronomy 

Concordia Station has been identified as a suitable location for extremely accurate astronomical observations. The transparency of the Antarctic atmosphere permits the observation of stars even when the sun is at an elevation angle of 38°. Other advantages include the very low infrared sky emission, the high percentage of cloud-free time and the low aerosol and dust content of the atmosphere.

The median seeing measured with a DIMM Differential Image Motion Monitor  placed on top of an 8.5 m high tower is 1.3 ± 0.8 arcseconds.
This is significantly worse than most major observatory sites, but similar to other observatories in Antarctica. However, Lawrence et al. consider other features of the site and conclude that "Dome C is the best ground-based site to develop a new astronomical observatory". Note however that this was written before whole-atmospheric seeing measurements had been made at Dome C.

Thanks to the Single Star Scidar SSS, Vernin, Chadid and Aristidi et al. and Giordano, Vernin and Chadid et al. finally demonstrated that most of the optical turbulence is concentrated within the first 30 m atmospheric level at Dome C. The rest of the atmosphere is very quiet with a seeing of about 0.3-0.4 arcseconds, and the overall seeing is somewhat around 1.0 arcseconds.

Launched in 2007, PAIX the first robotic multi-color Antarctica Photometer
gives a new insight to cope with unresolved stellar enigma and stellar oscillation challenges and offers a great
opportunity to benefit from an access to the best astronomical site on Earth –Dome C–. Indeed, Chadid, Vernin, Preston et al.
implement, for the first time from the ground, a new way to study the stellar oscillations, pulsations and their evolutionary
properties with long uninterrupted and continuous precision observations over 150 days, and
without the regular interruptions imposed by the Earth rotation. PAIX achieves astrophysical UBVRI bands time-series measurements of stellar physics fields,
challenging photometry from Space.

The Antarctic Search for Transiting ExoPlanets (ASTEP) programme is composed of two telescopes: a 10 cm refractor installed in 2008, and a 40 cm telescope installed in 2010 and upgraded in 2022.

Climate 

The climate at Dome C where Concordia Station is located is frigid all year round, being one of the coldest places on Earth.

Humidity is low and it is also very dry, with very little precipitation throughout the year.

Dome C does not experience the katabatic winds typical for the coastal regions of Antarctica because of its elevated location and its relative distance from the edges of the Antarctic Plateau. Typical wind speed in winter is 2.8 m/s.

Winterovers

While the station has been in use for summer campaigns since December 1997, the first winterover (February to October) was only made in 2005. During this period, the station is inaccessible, requiring total autonomy.

First winter-over (DC01 – 2005)

The first winter began in mid-February 2005, with thirteen wintering (eleven French people and two Italians):
Michel Munoz: station leader, plumber, 
Roberto Dicasilati: physician, 
Christophe Mozer: powerhouse chief, 
Pascal Bordais: radio, electronics, computers, 
Emanuele Salvietti: glaciologist, 
Claire Le Calvez: technical chief, 
Michel Galland: electrician, 
Jean-Louis Duraffourg: chef, 
Abdelkarim Agabi (Karim Agabi): astronomer, 
Stéphane Beausire: boilermaker, welder, 
Jean Elegoet: vehicle mechanic, 
Jean-François Jurvilliers: multipurpose technician, 
Guillaume Dargaud: climatologist,  (under contract with the Italian National Antarctic Research Program – PNRA)
In September 2005 the highest temperature was −48 °C, with an average in August of −60.2 °C and a record of −78.6 °C on 1 September.
At these temperatures, trips outside had to be performed with the utmost care. Those going outside travelled at least in pairs and were equipped with a radio, spare batteries and a full fleece suit, with only the eyes at times visible. Italian Glaciologist Emanuele Salvietti had to take snow samples every day one kilometre from the base. As he had to walk (because no vehicle operates at these temperatures), he built a full face mask, with only a pipe to breathe. The slightest mistake would lead to certain injury, as astronomer Agabi Karim explained: "Burns on the cheeks and eyelashes glued to the lens of the telescope," after exposure to the freezing cold.

Second winter-over (DC02 – 2006)
The second winter was conducted from February to November 2006 with a team of ten wintering (six French and four Italian):
Minh Ly Pham Minh: station leader, physician, 
Michele Impara: computer science, 
Loïc Le Bechec: chef, 
Lucia Agnoletto: seismologist, 
Eric Aristidi: astronomer, 
Omar Cerri: glaciologist, 
Shaun Deshommes: technical chief, 
Elyseo D'Eramo: mechanic, 
José Dos Santos: electrician, 
Miguel Ravoux: plumber, 
The record temperature for this winter was measured at −80 °C on 5 September 2006 at 2:37 ET was renewed several times.

Third winter-over (DC03 – 2007)
The third winter ran from February to November 2007 with a team of wintering composed of fourteen people (eight French and six Italian):
François Jeanneaux: engineer, 
Jean-Pierre Pillisio: plumber, 
Carlos Marsal: chef, 
Maurizio Busetto: climatologist, 
Yvan Levy: technical chief, 
Nicolas Le Parc: electrician, 
Christophe Choley: mechanic, 
Federico Miliacca: computer and telecommunications, 
Djamel Mékarnia: astronomer, 
Runa Briguglio: astronomer, 
Giuseppe Soriani: surgeon, 
Pietro di Felice: station leader, engineer, 
Benedict Cuisset: technical, 
Alessandro Iacomino: glaciologist, 
The average temperature was −65 °C and the minimum temperature recorded was −81.9 °C reached on September 5.

Fourth winter-over (DC04 – 2008)
The fourth winter took place from 31 January 2008 to 8 November 2008 with a team consisting of thirteen winter-overs (seven French and six Italian):
Erick Bondoux: astronomer, 
Laurent Bonnardot: biomedical, 
Zalpha Challita: astronomer, 
Giorgio Deidda: chef, 
Sébastien Denamur: mechanic, 
Laurent Fromont: electrician, 
Daniele Frosini: glaciologist, 
Patrick LeRoy: technical chief, 
Fabrizio Martinet: plumber, 
Roberto Rainis: doctor, 
Lucia Sabbatini: astrophysicist, 
Riccardo Schioppo: climatologist, 
Jean-François Vanacker: station leader, radio,

Fifth winter-over (DC05 – 2009)
The fifth wintering took place from February 2009 to November 2009 with a team of twelve people (eight French, three Italian and one British):
Massimiliano Faiella: technical chief, 
Domenico Fasano: chef, 
William Frinot: plumber, 
Laura Genoni: glaciologist, 
Caroline Jullian: atmospheric chemistry, 
Alexander Leluc: mechanic, 
Eric Lotz: station leader, physician, 
Denis Petermann: astronomer, 
Cyprien Pouzenc: astronomer, 
Alex Salam: ESA biomedical research, 
Eric Tragin: electrician, 
Jonathan Zaccaria: radio, computer, science support,

Sixth winter-over (DC06 – 2010)
This Wintering took place with a team of thirteen (six French, six Italian and one Czech):
Jean-François Vanacker: station leader, 
Ales Rybka: ESA biomedical research, 
Karim Agabi: astronomer, 
Alessandro Bambini: electrician, 
Arthur Le Forestier: technical chief, 
Boris Padovan: computer, telecommunications, 
Christophe Rouy: mechanic, 
Daniele Karlicek: glaciologist, 
Giorgio Deidda: chef, 
Jean-Marie Moysan: plumber, 
Lorenzo Moggio: atmospheric chemistry, 
Rosa Forgittoni: doctor, 
Sylvain Lafont: glaciologist,

Seventh winter-over (DC07 – 2011)
The seventh wintering took place with a team of 14 people (seven French, six Italian and one British):
Andrea Cesana: station leader, doctor, 
Eoin MacDonald: ESA biomedical research, 
Djamel Mekarnia: astronomer, 
Eric Aristidi: astronomer, 
Alessandro Giusto: electrician, 
Sergeant Frederic: technical chief, 
Paolo Perfetti: computer, telecommunications, 
David Colin: mechanic, 
Domenico Romano: astronomer, glaciologist, 
Andrea Ballarini: chef, 
Vivien Koutcheroff: plumber, 
Ilann Bourgeois: atmospheric chemistry, glaciologist, 
Pascal Robert: technician seismology, magnetism, 
Angelo Galeandro: meteorologist,

Eighth winter-over (DC08 – 2012) 
The eighth wintering took place with a team of 13 people (seven French, four Italian, one Russian and one British):
 Erick Bondoux: station leader, electronic technician for science, 
 Alexander Kumar: Station physician and ESA biomedical research MD, 
 Barbara Grolla: nurse anesthetist, 
 Guillaume Bouchez: astronomer, 
 Alessandro Bambini: electrotechnician, 
 Stephane Calvo: technical chief, 
 Roberto D'Amato: informatician, telecommunications, 
 Bruno Limouzy: mecanician, 
 Mattia Bonazza: glaciologist, atmospheric chemistry, 
 Giorgio Deidda: chef, 
 Gérard Guérin: plumber, 
 Sebastien Aubin: glaciologist, atmospheric chemistry, 
 Igor Petenko: atmospheric science and climate, .

Ninth winter-over (DC09 – 2013)
The ninth wintering took place with a team of 15 people (nine French, five Italian and one Greek):
Anne-Marie Courant: station leader, physician, 
Evangelos Kaimakamis: ESA biomedical research, 
Helene Faradji: astronomer, 
Christophe Leroy Dos Santos: astronomer, 
Yann Reinert: astronomer, 
Jean Gabriel Coll: electrician, 
Yannick Marin: technical chief, 
Bruno Epifania: computer, telecommunications, 
Simon Reuze: mechanic, 
Elio Padoan: glaciologist, atmospheric chemistry, 
Luigi Vailati: chef, 
Olivier Delanoë: Plumber, 
Albane Barbero: glaciologist, atmospheric chemistry, meteorological maintenance, 
Antonio Litterio: electronic technician for science, 
Simonetta Montaguti: atmospheric science and climate,

Tenth winter-over (DC10 – 2014)
The tenth wintering took place with a team of 13 people (six French, five Italian, one Russian and one Greek):
Bruno Limouzy: Electrical motors, 
Giorgio Deidda: Chef, 
Tindari Ceraolo: Physician, 
Adrianos Golemis: ESA biomedical research, 
Pierre Pejoine: Mechanic, 
Paride Legovini: Physicist, Electronic technician for science, 
Julien Ribet: Electrotechnician, 
Tommaso Nicosia: Computer, telecommunications, 
Daniele Tavagnacco: Astrophysicist, 
Olivier Haye: Technical Chief, plumbing and heating, 
Cecile Lenormant: Chemist, 
Igor Petenko: Atmospheric science and climate, 
Xavier Joffrin: Astronomy, .

During the 2014 Antarctic winter Concordia was an active amateur radio station: Paride Legovini operated from there on a weekly basis with call sign IA/IZ3SUS. The HF radio equipment consists in a Rohde & Schwarz XK2100L transceiver with a 150W RF output and a delta loop antenna located a few hundreds of meters away from the station.

The analemma (path that the sun follows in the sky if photographed at precisely the same time every week through the course of a year) was imaged for the first time ever in Antarctica by Adrianos Golemis during the 10th winterover mission at Concordia Station (2013–2014). The resulting composite exposure image was selected as NASA Astronomy Picture of the Day (APOD) on 23 September 2015.

Eleventh winter-over (DC11 – 2015)
The eleventh wintering is taking place from February 2015 to November 2015 with a team of 13 people (six French, five Italian, one British and one Swiss):
Mario Salza: Station Leader, Information and Communications Technology (ICT), 
Yannick Marin: Technical Manager and Electrical motors, 
Antonietta Roveran: Physician, 
Roxanne Jacob: Glaciology and Atmospheric Chemistry, 
Luca Ficara: Chef, 
Guillaume Poirot: Mechanic, 
Giampietro Casasanta: Glaciology and Atmospheric Remote Sensing, 
Benoit Laurent: Electronics for Science, 
Markus Wildi: Astrophysics, 
Benoit Joncheray: Plumbing and Heating Engineering Technician, 
Lorenzo Moggio: Atmospheric physics, 
Beth Healey: ESA Biomedical Research, 
Rémi Puaud: Electrical Engineering Technician,

Twelfth winter-over (DC12 – 2016)
The twelfth winter began on February 10, 2016, with twelve overwintering (five Italian, six French, one Dutch):
Elvio Lazzarini: Physician,  
Alessandro Fausto: Information and Communications Technology (ICT),  
Luciano Milano: Electronics for Science,  
Vitale Stanzione: Station Leader, Glaciology,  
Bertrand Bonnefoy: Chef,  
Floris van den Berg: ESA Biomedical Research MD,  
Georges Karakasidis: Electrician, 
Henri van den Hove: Plumbing and Heating Engineering Technician, 
Olivier Leloir: Technical Chief, 
Gaetan Quere: Mechanic, 
Simonetta Montaguti: Atmospheric Science and Climate, 
Nicole Hueber: Glaciology and Atmospheric Chemistry,

Thirteenth winter-over (DC13 – 2017)
The thirteenth winter began on February 9, 2017, with thirteen overwintering (five French, seven Italian, one Belgian Canadian):
Simone Chicarella: Electronics for Science, Station Leader, 
Andrea Tosti: Information and Communications Technology (ICT). 
Didier L'Hôte: Technical Chief, 
Aldo Clemenza: Medical Doctor, 
Simone Marcolin: Chef, 
Laura Caiazzo: Glaciology and Atmospheric Chemistry, 
Sébastien Jullien-Palletier: Electrician, 
Yuri de Prà: Astronomy, 
Carole Dangoisse: ESA Biomedical Research MD,  
Alexis Robin: Plumbing and Heating Engineering Technician, 
Pol Monfort: Mechanic, 
Alfonso Ferrone: Atmospheric Science and Climate, 
Paul Serre: Chemistry,

Fourteenth winter-over (DC14 – 2018)
The fourteenth winter began on February 6, 2018, with thirteen overwintering (five French, seven Italian, one Austrian):
 Moreno Baricevic: Electronics for Science, 
 Remi Bras: Electrician, 
 Coline Bouchayeur: Glaciology and Atmospheric Chemistry, 
 Andre Bourre: Technical Chief, 
 Marco Buttu: Astronomy, 
 Filippo Cali' Quaglia: Atmospheric Science and Climate, 
 Florentin Camus: Plumbing and Heating Engineering Technician, 
 Mario Giorgioni: Information and Communications Technology (ICT), 
 Carmen Possnig: ESA Biomedical Research MD, 
 Jacques Rattel: Mechanic, 
 Alberto Razeto: Medical Doctor, 
 Marco Smerilli: Chef, 
 Cyprien Verseux: Glaciology and Atmospheric Chemistry, Station Leader,

Fifteenth winter-over (DC15 – 2019)
The fifteenth winter began on February 13, 2019, with thirteen overwintering (five French, six Italian, one Danish and one Australian):
 Nadja Albertsen: ESA Biomedical Research MD, 
 Damien Beloin: Mechanic, 
 Ivan Bruni: Astronomy, 
 Massimiliano Catricalà: Electronics for Science, Station Leader, 
 Giuditta Celli: Glaciology and Atmospheric Chemistry, 
 Meganne Louise Christian: Atmospheric Science and Climate,  
 Gianluca Ghiselli: Medical Doctor, 
 Daniele Giambruno: Chef, 
 Thibault Gillet: Electrician, 
 Bertrand Laine: Technical Chief, 
 Julien Le Goff: Plumbing and Heating Engineering Technician, 
 Alessandro Mancini: Information and Communications Technology (ICT), 
 Julien Moyé: Glaciology and Atmospheric Chemistry,

Sixteenth winter-over (DC16 – 2020)
The sixteenth winter began on February 7, 2020, with twelve overwintering (seven French, four Italian, one Dutch):
 Camille Bréant: Glaciology and Atmospheric Chemistry, 
 Elisa Calmon: Chef, 
 Andrea Ceinini: Mechanic, 
 Loredana Faraldi: Medical Doctor, 
 Sylvain Guesnier: Chief of the power plant, 
 Luca Ianniello: Information and Communications Technology (ICT), 
 Vivien Koutcheroff: Plumbing and Technical Chief, 
 Wenceslas Marie Sainte: Electronics for Science, 
 Inès Ollivier: Glaciology and Atmospheric Chemistry, 
 Bastien Prat: Electrician, 
 Alberto Salvati: Atmospheric Science and Climate, Station Leader, 
 Stijn Thoolen: ESA Biomedical Research MD,

Seventeenth winter-over (DC17 – 2021)
The seventeenth winter began on January 31, 2021, with twelve overwintering (five French, six Italian, one British):
 Cédric Albert: Electrician, 
 Dennis Appere: Glaciology and Atmospheric Chemistry, 
 Fabio Borgognoni: Glaciology and Atmospheric Chemistry, 
 Marco Buttu: Electronics for Science, 
 Rodolfo Canestrari: Atmospheric Science and Climate, Station Leader, 
 Giuseppina Canestrelli: Medical Doctor, 
 Charles Delgrange: Mechanic, 
 Simone Marcolin: Chef, 
 Quentin Perret: Boilermaker, Welder and Multipurpose Technician, 
 Jean-François Roques: Technical Chief, 
 Nicholas Smith: ESA Biomedical Research MD, 
 David Tosolini: Information and Communications Technology (ICT),

Eighteenth winter-over (DC18 – 2022)
The eighteenth winter began on 7 February 2022, with thirteen overwintering (six French, six Italian and one Swedish):
 Massimiliano Catricalà: Station Leader, Electronics for Science, 
 Fabien Farge: Medical Doctor, 
 Angelo Galeandro: Atmospheric Science and Climate, 
 Thomas Gasparetto: Astronomy, 
 Nicolas Girard: Electrician, 
 Stanislas Grabowski: Boilermaker, Welder and Multipurpose Technician, 
 Hannes Hagson: ESA Biomedical Research MD, 
 Alessia Nicosia: Glaciology, 
 Thomas Antonio Massimo Pagano: Information and Communications Technology (ICT), 
 Frederic Sergent: Technical Chief, 
 Marco Smerilli: Chef, 
 Pierre Supiot: Mechanic, 
 Julien Witwicky: Glaciology and Atmospheric Chemistry,

Nineteenth winter-over (DC19 – 2023) 
The nineteenth winter began on 7 February 2023, with twelve overwintering (six French, five Italian and one German):
 Claude Blanc: Mechanic, 
 Rudy Bunel: Technical Chief, 
 Davide Carlucci: Station Leader, Electronics for Science, 
 Stéphane Fraize: Medical Doctor, 
 Sascha Freigang: ESA Biomedical Research MD, 
 Jacopo Lucini Paioni: Chef, 
 Vincent Morel: Electrotechnician, 
 Domenico Mura: Astronomy, 
 Damien Pessieau: Plumbing and Heating Engineering Technician, 
 Luca Rago: Glaciology, 
 Damien Till: Glaciology and Atmospheric Chemistry, 
 Andrea Traverso: Information and Communications Technology (ICT),

See also 

List of research stations in Antarctica
 List of Antarctic field camps
 List of airports in Antarctica
 Amundsen–Scott South Pole Station
 Casey Station
 Concordia Subglacial Lake
 Dome A (or Dome Argus)
 Dome C (also known as Dome Charlie or Dome Circe)
 Dome F (or Dome Fuji)
 Dumont d'Urville Station
 EPICA
 Ice core
 Law Dome
 Neumayer-Station III
 Vostok Station
 Zucchelli Station
 List of Mars analogs

References

External links 

 Official website Concordia Station
 Official website of the Italian Antarctic Programme
 Official website IPEV Institut Polaire Français Paul Emile Victor
 IPEV Concordia Station 
 Chronicles from Concordia - winter over ESA blog
 Automated Astrophysical Site-Testing International Observatory (AASTINO)
  1st Winterover at Concordia Station (2005) blog by Guillaume Dargaud, ISAC (Istituto di Scienze dell'Atmosfera e del Clima)
  2nd Winterover at Concordia Station (2006) blog by Eric Aristidi, LUAN (Laboratoire Universitaire d'Astrophysique de Nice)
  5th Winterover at Concordia Station (2009), blog by Cyprien Pouzenc, Laboratoire Fizeau (Nice, ex-LUAN), Observatoire Sirene
 COMNAP Antarctic Facilities
 COMNAP Antarctic Facilities Map

2005 establishments in Antarctica
Outposts of Antarctica
France and the Antarctic
Italy and the Antarctic
Human analog missions
Research institutes established in 2005